Bakhtiyor Rahimov (born 1981 in Dushanbe) is an Tajik powerlifter. Powerlifting World Champion. He is Vice President of the Federation of Powerlifting, Bodybuilding and Fitness of Tajikistan.

Career 
Born 28 December 1981 in Dushanbe. His father, Rashid Rakhimov, was a professor at the Further Mathematics Department of the Tajik State Finance and Economics University. His mother, Safargul Saidova, was a teacher at the Presidential Lyceum-boarding school for gifted children in Dushanbe.

He is a graduate of school 33 in Dushanbe. His education continued at the Russian-Tajik Slavonic University, where he graduated with a degree in law (1998-2003). In 2008, he acquired a second higher education at the Tajik State University of Commerce.

Rakhimov began doing sports at school. At first it was kickboxing, however subsequently  he switched to weightlifting. He has been doing powerlifting since 2013. In 2016, he took second and third places in the Tajikistan Powerlifting Championship. After winning national championships under the guidance of Tole Kholnazarov, Olim Parpiev and Khayriddin Rizoev, he started to prepare to participate in international competitions.

In September 2017, the World Championship “Gold Tiger-11” (NPA) was held in Yekaterinburg, Russia, where Bakhtiyor Rahimov won six gold and one bronze medals. In December 2017, in the Asian Open Cup “Steel Arena 7” (NPA), held in Berdsk, Russia, he won five gold and one silver medal. Later in December 2017, in the European Cup in powerlifting and power sports (NPA), which was held in Yekaterinburg, Russia, he won two gold and one bronze medals. In the same year, after winning international championships, he was awarded the title of master of sports in powerlifting and deadlift by "National Powerlifting Association" (NPA).

In September 2018, Bakhtiyor Rahimov won four gold, one silver, and one bronze medals in Powerlifting World Championship “Gold Tiger-12” (NPA), held in Yekaterinburg. In October 2018, in the World Powerlifting Championship (WRPF), held in Moscow (Russia), he won one gold and two bronze medals.

In September 2019, he participated in the international festival "Arnold Classic Europe" (IPF), which was held in Barcelona, Spain. In October 2019, Bakhtiyor Rahimov won three gold medals in the Russian Powerlifting Championship “Golden Tiger-13” (NPA), held in Yekaterinburg, Russia. In December 2019, in the World Powerlifting Cup (WPC), held in Moscow, Russia, he won a gold medal.

In 2021, he participated in the World Powerlifting Championship (IPF) which was held in Halmstad, Sweden. In the 2021 Asian Open Cup in power sports (“Steel Arena-7”), held in Berdsk, he won five gold and one silver medals.

In November 2022, in the World Powerlifting Championship, which was held in Orlando (Florida, USA), Rakhimov won a gold medal in powerlifting competitions and a silver medal in deadlift competitions.

He is the Vice President of the Powerlifting, Bodybuilding and Fitness Federation of Tajikistan.

Statistics

References

External links 
 Профиль на сайте allpowerlifting.com
 Профиль на сайте openpowerlifting.org

Sportspeople from Dushanbe
Tajikistani people
1981 births
Living people